A Man and His Music is a 1965 double album by Frank Sinatra. It provides a brief retrospective of Sinatra's musical career. The album won the 1967 Grammy Award for Album of the Year.

Instead of using the original recordings, which were made for RCA, Columbia and Capitol Records, and therefore not licensed for use by his then-current label, Reprise, Sinatra used re-recorded versions for the majority of the album's songs, culling tracks from his prior Reprise albums. Three songs were specifically recorded for the project: "I'll Never Smile Again", "Come Fly with Me" and "Love and Marriage". There is also a narration from Sinatra that runs throughout the album.

Approximately 2,000 copies of this album were originally released in a special wooden slipcase containing 3D artwork on the cover in the form of a metal plaque. Each copy was numbered and contained a signed card by Sinatra himself. The packaging also included a booklet highlighting Sinatra's career. A majority of these special "Man and His Music" LP's were given away as door prizes by Sinatra at a party in Palm Springs. The party celebrated the singer's 50th birthday, as well as the airing of Sinatra's 1965 NBC television special of the same name (Frank Sinatra: A Man and His Music).

Track listing

Disc One
"All or Nothing at All" (Arthur Altman, Jack Lawrence) (originally arr. by Andy Gibson (1939); arr. by Nelson Riddle (1965))- 4:26
"I'll Never Smile Again" (1965 re-recorded version) (feat. Fred Waring and His Pennsylvanians) (Lowe) (originally arr. by Fred Stulce (1940); arr. by Riddle (1965))- 2:49
"Night and Day" (Cole Porter) (originally arr. by Axel Stordahl (1942 & 1947); arr. by Don Costa (1965)) - 4:29
"Oh! What It Seemed to Be" (Bennie Benjamin, George David Weiss, Frankie Carle) (originally arr. by Stordahl (1946); arr. by (1965)) - 3:26
"Nancy (With the Laughing Face)" (Phil Silvers, Van Heusen) (originally arr. by Stordahl (1944); arr. by (1965)) - 4:21

Disc Two
"Come Fly with Me" (1965 re-recorded version) (Sammy Cahn, Van Heusen) (originally arr. by Billy May (1958); arr. by (1965)) - 2:13
"(How Little It Matters) How Little We Know" (Carolyn Leigh, Phil Springers) (originally arr. by Riddle (1958); arr. by (1965)) - 2:29
"Learnin' the Blues" (Dolores Vicki Silvers) (originally arr. by Riddle (1956); arr. by (1965)) - 2:31
"In the Wee Small Hours of the Morning" (David Mann, Bob Hilliard) (originally arr. by Riddle (1957); arr. by (1965)) - 2:43
"Young at Heart" (Leigh, Johnny Richards) (originally arr. by Riddle (1953); arr. by (1965)) - 3:51
"Witchcraft" (1965 re-recorded version) (Cy Coleman, Leigh) (originally arr. by Riddle (195); arr. by (1965)) - 2:52
"All the Way" (Cahn, Van Heusen) (originally arr. by Riddle (1961); arr. by (1965)) - 3:27
"Love and Marriage" (1965 re-recorded version) (Cahn, Van Heusen) (originally arr. by Riddle (195); arr. by (1965)) - 1:29
"I've Got You Under My Skin" (Porter) (originally arr. by Riddle (195); arr. by (1965)) - 3:26
"Ring-a-Ding Ding" (Cahn, Van Heusen) (originally arr. by Johnny Mandel (1961); arr. by (1965)) - 1:07
"The Summit" (Frank Sinatra, Dean Martin, Sammy Davis, Jr.) - 5:20
"Luck Be a Lady" (Loesser) (originally arr. by May (196); arr. by (1965)) - 2:25
"Fly Me to the Moon" (Bart Howard) (originally arr. by Quincy Jones (196); arr. by (1965)) - 2:30
"My Kind of Town" (1965 re-recorded version) (from Robin and the 7 Hoods) (Cahn, Van Heusen) (originally arr. by Riddle (196); arr. by (1965)) - 2:30
"The September of My Years" (Cahn, Van Heusen) (originally arr. by Gordon Jenkins (196); arr. by (1965)) - 3:22

Personnel
Frank Sinatra - vocals
Count Basie and his orchestra
Fred Waring and his Pennsylvanians - backing choir
Don Costa - arranger, conductor
Ernie Freeman - arranger
Neal Hefti - arranger
Gordon Jenkins - arranger
Johnny Mandel - arranger
Billy May - arranger
Sy Oliver - arranger
Nelson Riddle - arranger
Freddie Stulce - arranger
Sonny Burke - conductor, producer
Morris Stoloff

Certifications

References

1965 albums
Frank Sinatra albums
Reprise Records albums
Grammy Award for Album of the Year
Albums produced by Sonny Burke
Albums arranged by Don Costa
Albums conducted by Don Costa
Albums conducted by Sonny Burke